Una plegaria en el camino, (English: A prayer on the road) is a 1969 Mexican telenovela produced by Televisa and originally transmitted by Telesistema Mexicano.

Cast 
Enrique Aguilar
Carlos Ancira
Rosalba Brambila
Jorge Castillo

References

External links 

Mexican telenovelas
Televisa telenovelas
Spanish-language telenovelas
1969 telenovelas
1969 Mexican television series debuts
1969 Mexican television series endings